Phocea was a sailing yacht that was built at Toulon, France, by DCAN in 1976. She is 246 feet long (75 meters) and can cruise at 12 knots. Like many yachts, she has undergone a number of refits, a major one having been in 2000 in Germany. She can handle 12 guests supported by a crew of 16 sailors. Phocea is a schooner with four masts. Phocea was originally built for speed, and she crossed the Atlantic in 8 days and achieved speeds of 30 knots under sail. The yacht has also been converted more for luxury and used on the charter market.

The Phocea was the World's largest sailing yacht before the 2004 launching of Athena, by Royal Huisman. She was built at the Toulon Naval Dockyard in 1976 for renowned single-handed yachtsman Alain Colas, who named her Club Méditerranée.  Shortly after competing in the Observer Single-Handed Trans-Atlantic Race, she was converted into the charter yacht Club Méditerranée. Later in 1997, she was reffited and renamed La Vie Claire with a new Jorg Biederbeck interior design and a new Tim Heywood exterior design.

The Phocea was partially destroyed by fire on 18 February 2021 and sank the next day. She was anchored in Langkawi archipelago in Malaysia.

Refit

In July 1997, Phocea was purchased by Mouna Ayoub and modernized at Lürssen. Whilst retaining her unmistakable identity, she has received major interior and exterior enhancements by British naval architect Butch Dalrymple-Smith. The interiors feature wood panelling and furniture designed by David Linley. The Owner's Suite is situated on the main deck, whilst the VIP guest cabin and four other double cabins, all with full ensuite facilities, are located on the lower deck. She won the 1999 ShowBoats award for best refit.

Ayoub's ex-husband Nasser Al-Rashid partly paid for the $17 million refit of the Phocea with the sale of "The Mouna", a 112 carat (22.4 g) record-breaking diamond.

Timeline
1976 - Built at Toulon, France DCAN yards
Rebuilt between 1983-1986 at Marseille, France  
Major Refit in 1997, 2000 at Lürssen, Germany
Refit in 2006 at Barcelona, Spain
Sold in 2010 by Fraser Yacht broker

About

Phocea was designed originally by boat designer Michel Bigoin, who also designed the yachts S/Y Xargo (1976) and M/Y Attila V (1989).

Additional Designers
Exterior Tim Heywood (Tim Heywood Design) and Butch Dalrymple Smith
Interior Jorg Biederbeck (Biederbeck Designs)
Interior Decorations David Linley furniture

Names:
Phocea
La Vie Claire
Club Méditerranée
Phocea

Events
Phocea crashed into rocks off Sardinia in August 2005 while the Prince and Princess Michael of Kent were aboard. Three people were seriously injured. The yacht was damaged below the waterline.

Caught fire on 18 Feb 21 off the coast of Langkawi, Malaysia.

Specification

Length overall: 246 ft (75.0 m)
Beam: 31.43 ft (9.58 m)
Draft: 20.47 ft (6.24 m)
Number of guests: 12
Number of crew: 15
Built: 1976 by Toulon Naval Dockyard (major refit at Lurssen in 1999)
Designer: Michel Bigion
Engines: 1 x  MTU
Cruising speed: about  under power, 12-18 knots under sail
Approximate range: 
Fuel consumption: 195 litres (51 US gallons) per hour at  cruising

See also
List of large sailing yachts

References

External links

Four-masted ships
Sailing yachts built in France
1970s sailing yachts